Ferrals-les-Corbières is a commune in the Aude department in southern France.

Geography
The river Orbieu flows northeast through the western part of the commune and crosses the village.

Population

See also
 Corbières AOC
 Communes of the Aude department

References

Communes of Aude
Aude communes articles needing translation from French Wikipedia